Anholt may refer to:

Places
Anholt (Denmark), Danish island
Anholt, Netherlands, village in Drenthe, Netherlands
Anholt, Germany, district of the city of Isselburg, Germany
The Lordship of Anholt, historical state

People
Christien Anholt (born 1971), British stage, television and film actor
Darrell Anholt (born 1962), Canadian ice hockey player
Laurence Anholt (born 1959), British author/illustrator
Pele van Anholt (born 1991), Dutch footballer
Simon Anholt, independent policy advisor
Tony Anholt (1941–2002), British actor (father of Christien Anholt)

See also
Battle of Anholt, an 1811 battle between the UK and Denmark-Norway in the Gunboat War
Saxony-Anhalt, a state of Germany